Holubice (from a Czech word for a female pigeon) is the name of several locations in the Czech Republic:

 Holubice (Prague-West District), a village in the Central Bohemian Region
 Holubice (Vyškov District), a village in the South Moravian Region